"Who Do You Think You're Foolin'" is a song by American singer Donna Summer from her album The Wanderer. The song was written by Pete Bellotte, Sylvester Levay and Jerry Rix and produced by Bellotte and Giorgio Moroder. Though not a big hit, it briefly made the Top 40 in the U.S. during the spring of 1981.

The song was remixed in the early 2000s on an independent DJ label to a more current electronica beat and was a hit in gay discos in larger American urban centers.

Track listing
 "Who Do You Think You're Foolin'" (Bellotte, Levay, Rix) - 3:59
 "Running For Cover" (Summer) - 3:47

Chart positions

Notes

AChart placing refers to the chart placing of The Wanderer. All tracks from The Wanderer album charted together on the Billboard Dance Music/Club Play Singles chart.

References

1981 singles
Donna Summer songs
Songs written by Pete Bellotte
Song recordings produced by Giorgio Moroder
Song recordings produced by Pete Bellotte
1980 songs
Geffen Records singles